My Name Is Pecos is a 1966 Italian Spaghetti Western film directed by Maurizio Lucidi. It was followed by Pecos Cleans Up the next year.

Plot
As a child, Pecos Martinez witnessed how Joe Clane had Pecos' family wiped out. By now Pecos is a grown man who's out for revenge, but Clane has a whole city under his sway. All too soon Pecos is made and Clane's henchmen are just too many. Once he's trapped and captured, he needs to conceive a striking ruse if he wants to live.

Cast 
 Robert Woods as Pecos Martinez 
 Pier Paolo Capponi as Joe Clane
 Lucia Modugno as Mary Burton
 Peter Carsten as Steve 
 Luigi Casellano as Eddie
 Cristina Iosani as Nina
 Corrine Fontaine as Lola
 Giuliano Raffaelli as Dr. Burton
 Umberto Raho as Morton
 Maurizio Bonuglia as Ned
 Massimo Righi as Jack

Release
My Name Is Pecos was released in Italy in December 1966 as Due once di piombo (Il mio nome è Pecos). The film was the first spaghetti western that started the trend of films with titles containing the phrase My Name is... or They Call Me..., which followed with such films as They Call Me Trinity or My Name is Nobody. The film was released outside Italy, including the United Kingdom in 1968 by Golden Era Films where it was cut to receive an X-rating. It was also released in West Germany in 1967, where Woods' character was renamed Jonny Madoc, which became the film's title. My Name Is Pecos was successful enough in Italy to receive a sequel, released in March 1967, titled Pecos Cleans Up.

Arrow Video released the film alongside Massacre Time, Bandidos and And God Said to Cain as part of their Blu-ray box set Vengeance Trails: Four Classic Westerns on July 27, 2021.

References

Sources

External links

1966 films
Spaghetti Western films
1966 Western (genre) films
Films directed by Maurizio Lucidi
1960s Italian films